Jean-Jacques Herbulot (29 March 1909 – 22 July 1997) was a French sailor and competitor in sailing at the Summer Olympics. He was also a noted naval architect and designed many sailboats.

Early life and education
Herbulot was born in Belval, Ardennes in France. His formal education was as an architect and he earned a Diplôme d'Ingénieur. However, he soon turned his attention to sailboat design instead.

Design career
Herbulot started designing boats in 1947, specializing in sailboats of plywood construction for amateur builders and for sailing schools. He designed over 100 boat types during his design career. He is described by Bruce McArthur as "one of the best known figures in the French sailing world. As a designer, he is responsible for bringing the sport of sailing to those who had never before had the means to participate."

During the 1950s Herbulot also designed a new style of diagonal-cut spinnaker that was widely adopted by racing sailors.

Olympics
Herbulot competed in sailing in the Los Angeles 1932 Summer Olympics and the Kiel 1936 Summer Olympics in the Star class. In the Torquay 1948 Summer Olympics he sailed in the Firefly dinghy class and in the Melbourne 1956 Summer Olympics completed in the 5.5 Metre keelboat class.

Death
Herbulot died on 22 July 1997 in Blois, Loir-et-Cher, France at age 88.

Boat designs
Some of his designs include:
Herbulot Le Dinghy - 1948
Herbulot Grondin - 1948
Herbulot Vaurien - 1951
Herbulot Caravelle - 1952
Herbulot P'Tit Gars - 1953
Herbulot Corsaire - 1954
Herbulot Maraudeur - 1958
Herbulot Milord - 1963
Herbulot Mousquetaire - 1964
Oceanix - 1964
Oceanix TX - 1966
Flibustier - 1982
Herbulot Cap Corse - 1959
Herbulot Cap Horn - 1959
Herbulot Cap Vert - 1959
As de Pique - 1962
As de Trefle - 1962
Herbulot Boucanier - 1962
Brick (keelboat) - 1964
Herbulot Etendard - 1968
Figaro 5 - 1975
Figaro 6 - 1982

References

1909 births
1997 deaths
French male sailors (sport)
Olympic sailors of France
Sailors at the 1932 Summer Olympics – Star
Sailors at the 1936 Summer Olympics – Star
Sailors at the 1948 Summer Olympics – Firefly
Sailors at the 1956 Summer Olympics – 5.5 Metre